Lin Shan (born 2 March 1986) is a Chinese retired goalball player. She won a silver medal in both the 2008 Summer Paralympics and the 2012 Summer Paralympics.

Due to a hereditary disease, she has been blind since her youth. She attended Beijing Union University and was the only university student on the 2008 Paralympic team.

Like her national teammates Fan Feifei, Wang Ruixue, and Ju Zhen, Fan started playing the sport under coach Wang Jinqin at the Weifang School of the Blind in Weifang, Shandong.

References

Female goalball players
1986 births
Living people
Sportspeople from Shandong
People from Zhucheng
Paralympic goalball players of China
Paralympic silver medalists for China
Goalball players at the 2008 Summer Paralympics
Goalball players at the 2012 Summer Paralympics
Medalists at the 2008 Summer Paralympics
Medalists at the 2012 Summer Paralympics
Paralympic medalists in goalball
Beijing Union University alumni
21st-century Chinese women